is a railway station in the city of Tsuruga, Fukui, Japan, operated by West Japan Railway Company (JR West). It is served by the Hokuriku Main Line and the Obama Line. A freight-only branch Line known as the Tsuruga Port Line operated by JR Freight also runs from this station.

Lines

Tsuruga is scheduled to become a station on the high-speed Hokuriku Shinkansen line when the extension west of  opens around 2025.

Station layout

The station has three island platforms serving seven tracks. It has a "Midori no Madoguchi" staffed ticket office. The station platforms were rebuilt in December 2012, while a new station building was completed at the end of 2013. The overhead line power supply changes between 1,500 V DC and 20 kV AC (60 Hz) at this station (Hokuriku Main Line only).

Platforms

Adjacent stations

History
Tsuruga Station opened on 10 March 1882. With the privatization of JNR on 1 April 1987, the station came under the control of JR West.

Station numbering was introduced in March 2018 with Tsuruga being assigned station number JR-A01 for the Hokuriku Main Line and JR-B08 for the Kosei Line.

Future plans
From October 2014, a gauge-changing test track was scheduled to be built next to the station on the site of the former motive power depot. The aim is to prove durability in cold and snowy conditions with a view to using the variable-gauge Gauge Change Train on through services between the standard-gauge Hokuriku Shinkansen and narrow-gauge Hokuriku Main Line in the future.

Passenger statistics
In fiscal 2016, the station was used by an average of 3,610 passengers daily (boarding passengers only).

Surrounding area
Tsuruga Public Library
Fukui University, Tsuruga campus

See also
 List of railway stations in Japan

References

External links

 JR West station information 

Railway stations in Fukui Prefecture
Stations of West Japan Railway Company
Railway stations in Japan opened in 1882
Hokuriku Main Line
Obama Line
Stations of Japan Freight Railway Company
Tsuruga, Fukui